Dagfinn Henrik Olsen (born 29 June 1966) is a Norwegian politician for the Progress Party.

He served as a deputy representative to the Parliament of Norway from Nordland during the terms 1997–2001, 2013–2017 and 2017–2021. When regular representative Kjell-Børge Freiberg became a cabinet member in August 2018, Olsen took his place as a regular. He assumed a seat in the Standing Committee on Transport and Communications. Hailing from Lødingen, he had been elected on local and regional level.

References

1966 births
Living people
People from Lødingen
Nordland politicians
Progress Party (Norway) politicians
Members of the Storting